"Ailein duinn" ("Dark-haired Alan") is a traditional Scottish Gaelic song for solo female voice, a lament that was written for Ailean Moireasdan ("Alan Morrison") by his fiancée, Annag Chaimbeul ("Annie Campbell"). Ailean Moireasdan was a sea captain from the isle of Lewis. In the spring of 1788, he left Stornoway to go to Scalpay, Harris, where he was to be engaged to Annag Chaimbeul ("Annie Campbell"). Unfortunately, they sailed into a storm and all the crew sank with the vessel, off the coast of the Shiant Islands. The broken-hearted Annag wasted away through grief and composed this lament for her lost love. Annag lost her will to live and died a few months afterwards. Because there was not enough soil on the barren island of Scalpay, her father took her in her coffin by boat to a cemetery on the main island of Harris. However, a storm caused the coffin to be blown off her father's boat and it washed up on the same island her fiancé's body had been found.

Lyrics
There are many versions of the lyrics and of the melody; the following version was used in the film Rob Roy (the untranslated words are vocables):

Rob Roy version

Gura mise tha fo éislean
Moch sa mhaduinn is mi 'g éirigh

Sèist:
Ò hì shiùbhlainn leat
Hì ri bhò hò ru bhì
Hì ri bhò hò rinn o ho
Ailein Duinn, ò hì shiubhlainn leat

Ma 's e 'n cluasag dhut a' ghaineamh
Ma 's e leabaidh dhut an fheamainn

Ma 's e 'n t-iasg do choinnlean geala
Ma 's e na ròin do luchd-faire

Dh'òlainn deoch ge b' oil le càch e
De dh'fhuil do choim 's tu 'n déidh do bhathadh

English translation

How sorrowful I am
When I rise early in the morning

Chorus (after each verse):
Ò hì, I would go with you
Hì ri bhò hò ru bhì
Hì ri bhò hò rinn o ho
Brown-haired Alan, ò hì, I would go with you

If the sand be your pillow
If the seaweed be your bed

If the fish are your candles bright
If the seals are your watchmen

I would drink, though all would abhor
Of your heart's blood after you were drowned

References
"Sea Room. An Island Life in the Hebrides" by Adam Nicholson.

External links

Background story, words and translation, School of Scottish Studies
Music study on Ailein Duinn
Ailein Duinn on celticlyricscorner.net
Lyrics and recording informations

Harris, Outer Hebrides
Songs released posthumously
Scottish folk songs
Scottish Gaelic music
Scottish Gaelic poems